The Department of Defense Inspector General Distinguished Service Award is the highest civilian award given by the United States Department of Defense Office of the Inspector General. This award and accompanying Distinguished Service Medal is the DOD OIG's highest award granted to those who distinguished themselves by exceptional service or contributions of the broadest scope to the OIG or DoD.  The achievements or service must be truly exceptional when measured against the position requirements of the individual and should far exceed the contributions and service of others with comparable responsibilities.

Criteria
This decoration should be reserved for contributions that are so unusual and/or significant that recognition at the Inspector General level is warranted.  Recognition should be based on, but not limited to: 
a. Exceptional devotion to duty and clearly significant contributions of a broad scope to the efficiency, economy, or other improvement in the operations of the OIG or the Department. 
b. Accomplishments that show unusual management abilities, innovative thinking, and/or outstanding leadership that benefit the OIG. 
c. Accomplishments resulting in major cost savings/reductions/avoidance. 
d. Courage and voluntary risk of personal safety in the face of danger in the performance of assigned duties that benefited the Government or its personnel. 
e. Other exemplary service or contribution.  (Normally, the nominee has received the DoD Inspector General Medal for Superior Civilian Service and/or the DoD Inspector General Medal for Meritorious Civilian Service.)

Eligibility
OIG employees who meet all of the following criteria are eligible for consideration: 
a. Must be a permanent civilian employee with at least one year of the OIG service.  (The length of service requirement may be waived if the award is for an act of heroism.) 
b. Must have no pending or final performance or adverse actions against him/her during a period of at least 3 years before the nomination date for this award. 
c. Must be a United States Citizen.

See also
Awards and decorations of the United States government

References

DONHQ
DOD press release
CPMS

DOD Inspector General Distinguished Service Award